Demetri Quarte Goodson (born June 11, 1989) is an American football executive and former cornerback. He is a college scout for the Green Bay Packers after playing five seasons in the National Football League (NFL) for the Packers and New Orleans Saints. He played college football at Baylor. Goodson was drafted by the Packers in the sixth round of the 2014 NFL Draft.

College career
Goodson attended Baylor University, where he played on the Baylor Bears football team from 2011 to 2013 after transferring from Gonzaga University. From 2008 to 2011, he played on the Gonzaga Bulldogs men's basketball team.

College statistics

Professional career

Green Bay Packers
Goodson was selected in the sixth round (197th overall) by the Green Bay Packers in the 2014 NFL Draft, becoming the first Baylor player to be drafted by the team since Rell Tipton in 1977. On May 16, 2014, Goodson signed a contract with the Packers.

On April 8, 2016, Goodson was suspended by the NFL for the first four games of the 2016 season for violating the league's policy on performance-enhancing substances. In Week 11, Goodson was carted off the field with a knee injury and was placed on injured reserve on December 3, 2016.

Goodson was placed on the physically unable to perform list to start the 2017 due to the knee injury. He was activated off PUP on December 6, 2017. He then suffered a hamstring injury which kept him out two games before being placed on injured reserve on December 22, 2017, without playing a game in 2017.

On September 1, 2018, Goodson was released by the Packers.

New Orleans Saints
On October 4, 2018, Goodson was signed by the New Orleans Saints. He was released on October 17, 2018.

Scouting career
Goodson started his scouting career as an intern for the Green Bay Packers. He was promoted to Midwest Region scout to fill the void of Brandian Ross who was promoted to Southeast region scout.

NFL career statistics

Regular season

Personal life
Demetri is married to Linsey Goodson and they have one son. He is the younger brother of Mike Goodson, who played for the Carolina Panthers, Oakland Raiders, and New York Jets. He also has a half-brother, Jakar Hamilton who played for the Dallas Cowboys.

References

External links
Green Bay Packers bio 
Baylor Bears bio
Gonzaga Bulldogs bio

1989 births
Living people
Basketball players from West Virginia
Sportspeople from Charleston, West Virginia
Basketball players from Texas
Gonzaga Bulldogs men's basketball players
Players of American football from West Virginia
Players of American football from Texas
American football cornerbacks
Baylor Bears football players
Green Bay Packers players
New Orleans Saints players
American men's basketball players
Green Bay Packers executives